Paegam County is a kun, or county, in Ryanggang province, North Korea.

Geography
The terrain is mountainous, as Paegam lies atop the Paektu Plateau, the site of North Korea's tallest mountains. The Hamgyŏng and Machŏllyŏng ranges pass through the county; the highest point is Kwesangbong.  There are many streams; the chief of these is the Sodusu (서두수).  There are also wetlands; some 91% of the county's area is forestland.

Administrative divisions
Paegam county is divided into 1 ŭp (town), 19 rodongjagu (workers' districts) and 4 ri (villages):

Climate
Due to its inland location, the county has a severely cold continental climate. Paegam also has the highest wind speeds of any district in North Korea.

Economy
Mining and logging are important local industries. Mineral resources in the county include magnesite, alunite, kaolinite, copper, dolomite, tungsten, lead, zinc, gold and peat. Agriculture also plays a role, although only 4% of the county's land is cultivated. Local crops include wheat, barley, potatoes and soybeans. Livestock are also raised.

Transportation
Paegam is connected to the national road and rail grids; the Paektusan Ch'ŏngnyŏn and Paengmu lines of the Korean State Railway pass through the county.

See also
Geography of North Korea
Administrative divisions of North Korea
Ryanggang

External links

References

Counties of Ryanggang